The Royal Danish Air Force (RDAF) is the aerial warfare force of the Kingdom of Denmark and one of the four branches of the Danish Defence. Initially being components of the Army and the Navy, it was made a separate service in 1950. Its main purpose is to serve as enforcer of Danish airspace and to provide air support to Danish group troops on the battlefield.

History

The Royal Danish Air Force (RDAF) was formed as a military service independent from the army and navy in 1950 from the merger of the Danish Army Air Corps founded on 2 July 1912 and the Danish Naval Air Service which had been founded on 14 December 1911. All military aviation had been prohibited during the Nazi occupation from 1940 to 1945 and so as of V-E Day the Danish armed forces had no aircraft, but the Luftwaffe had built or expanded air bases in Denmark.

The air force was led by Lieutenant General C.C.J. Førslev, who had previously served as a colonel in the army and as first commander of the Danish Army Air Corps. The national command was located at Værløse Air Base which also served as Command East, while Command West was located at Karup in central Jutland. Royal Air Force volunteer and former member of the Free Norwegian Forces in England, Kaj Birksted, was appointed chief of the flying staff. The rivalries and mutual disrespect between the established officer Førslev, who had never been in air combat himself, and the experienced fighter ace Birksted led to a series of misunderstandings which delayed the operationalization of the air force. Further, the East and West commands lacked experience and knowledge of the newly delivered Gloster Meteor and F-84 Thunderjet aircraft.

The Danish armed forces received 38 surplus Supermarine Spitfire H. F. Mk. IXE and 3 P.R.Mk. XI in 1947–48 plus four additional airframes for ground instruction, which were operated by units of the Hærens Flyvertropper and Marinens Flyvevæsen prior to their merger, and by the Royal Danish Air Force until 1956, when the last examples were retired and all but two scrapped.

One survived for a number of years in a children's playground. The one surviving instructional airframe was later restored to depict the number '401' Spitfire Mk. IX. This airplane is now preserved at Dansk Veteranflysamling at Stauning Airfield in Jutland.

Pilot training was initially based at Avnø from May 1946 until 1951, when the school were transferred to the U.S. under the "Military Assistance Programme". The school at Avnø continued to conduct tests to choose the candidates for the American training programme. In 1947 the RDAF established a school for aircraft mechanics, based at Værløse Air Base. In 1951, the RDAF officers school was inaugurated at Rungstedlund north of Copenhagen, while airmen were educated at Værløse.

1950s
The air force received six F-84E Thunderjet and 238 F-84G Thunderjet as military aid from the US, and formed five new squadrons (726 to 730) at Karup Air Base from 1952 to 1954. The rapid expansion caused problems as neither two-seaters nor flight simulators were available, causing 89 crashed F-84's and 40 pilot casualties. Some casualties were due to the lack of experience in the newly formed air force while others stemmed from the tactics introduced by American WWII and Korean War-veterans based on fast and low flying attacks to avoid anti-aircraft fire.

To avoid further casualties the air force established a training squadron of two-seated T-33As in 1956 to train US-educated pilots to navigate under local weather conditions. Furthermore, Eskadrille 722 was changed to function as rescue squadron in 1956 and was strengthened by seven Sikorsky S-55 helicopters in 1957. Finally, Air Chief Marshal Hugh Saunders from Royal Air Force was employed in 1954 to reorganize the air force which led to the merger of Command East and West, forming Flyvertaktisk Kommando (Air Tactical Command) with the initial mission to lower the number of crashes during training.

1960s
In 1962, the Royal Danish Army's four SAM batteries based on Nike missiles were transferred to the air force. They were to defend Copenhagen against Soviet ballistic missiles and high altitude bombers and based as Eskadrille 531 in Gunderød, Eskadrille 532 at Kongelunden on Amager, Eskadrille 533 in Sigerslev and Eskadrille 534 in Tune. In 1965 four batteries of Hawk missiles were deployed close to the Nike batteries to protect them from low altitude aircraft.

In 1968, Denmark became the first of three export customers for the Saab 35 Draken (Kite/Dragon). Ever since 1966 the Danish government had started looking for an aircraft to replace two squadrons of Republic RF-84F Thunderflash reconnaissance aircraft and North American F-100 Super Sabre fighter/ground attacker aircraft. A number of candidates were considered and these were: the Douglas A-4F Skyhawk, Northrop F-5 Freedom Fighter, Vought A-7 Corsair II, Lockheed F-104 Starfighter, Dassault Mirage III/5 and Saab's Draken. The F-5 and Mirage 5 were the favourites while the Draken was one of the least popular since it had poor payload/range performance and could not carry heavy weapon loads. In response to the Kongelige Danske Flyvevåben's (Royal Danish Air Force's) initial dislike, Saab decided to create a new Draken variant that would put it on the top of the competition shortlist.

1970s
In the 1960s and 1970s, the RDAF operated a number of US financed Lockheed F-104G Starfighters, North American F-100D and F-100F Super Sabres, and several other types.

The first Danish Draken, designated F35, delivery took place on 1 September 1970 when three F35s were delivered to Karup Air Base. They were later followed by another 17 F35s and six TF35s. Since the F35s lacked radar, they replaced F-100Ds in the ground attack role. However, Sidewinder AAMS could be carried for self-defence. The six trainers were delivered between 1970 and 1972 and the F35s were delivered between 1970 and 1971.

In 1971, the Danish army created the Royal Danish Army Flying Service as the first air-unit outside the air force, since its creation in 1950. It had observation helicopters and piston-engined artillery spotting aeroplanes. In 1977 the Danish Naval Air Squadron was extracted from squadron 722 to the Danish navy, and it had ship-based helicopters. In a joint arms purchase four NATO countries: Denmark, Norway, Netherlands, and Belgium introduced the General Dynamics F-16 Fighting Falcon as their common strike fighter in January 1980. The F-16 was later bought by additional NATO countries, Greece and Turkey, and the United States of America, also a NATO member operates the F-16.

1980s
In 1982, the number of fighter aircraft was reduced by 12 units. General Dynamics F-16 is introduced to replace initially the F-100 and later the F-104G. The Royal Danish Naval Air Service is strengthened by eight Westland Lynx Mk. 80 from 1980, replacing the Alouette III helicopters. As a supplement to the Greenland-based C-130s the air force purchases three Gulfstream G-III.

1990s
In 1990, the Danish Army Air Corps purchases 12 Eurocopter Fennec lightweight attack helicopters to strengthen capabilities to perform expeditionary mission. The helicopters were transferred to RDAF in 2003.

In 1992, during the Yugoslavian civil wars, the RDAF C-130 Hercules aircraft were used for transport of the 900 Danish troops participating in the UN-led mission to the Balkans. In 1996, a C-130 joined the NATO On-Call International Airlift Pool along with a Gulfstream aircraft. The Gulfstreams were replaced by Challenger planes the following year, when the Danish government ordered the three Challengers in current use.

In 1999, following the end of the Cold War, the Danish air force was re-organised to be an "expeditionary" air force, capable of supporting international operations worldwide – but at the same time still being able to uphold its domestic air and seaward defence commitments. The same year, an expeditionary force of 9 F-16s to join the Operation Allied Force is approved in parliament.

2000s
In 2002, Denmark joined the F-35 Joint Strike Fighter Team, and eventually up to 48 F-35s could be bought to replace the F-16s.

In October 2002, a tri-national detachment of 18 Danish, Dutch, and Norwegian F-16 fighter-bombers, with one Dutch KC-10 tanker, flew to the Manas Air Base in Kyrgyzstan, in support of the NATO ground forces in Afghanistan as part of the Operation Enduring Freedom.

In 2004, the older C-130H Hercules fleet of three transport aircraft (bought by the government in 1973) was replaced by three of the more-advanced and stretched C-130J transport aircraft. A fourth C-130J joined in 2007.

In 2005, a modification program (Mid Life Update) was completed on the remaining F-16 aircraft. The modification programme, started in 1995, introduced a new mission computer, colour multifunction displays, and other avionic improvements. Despite the modifications and improvements, the Danish air force is considering the replacement of 30 F-16s with a more advanced fighter. Contenders include the two-seated Boeing F/A-18F Super Hornet, the Lockheed Martin F-35A Joint Strike Fighter and the Eurofighter Typhoon. The decision of the selected type will be announced before the end of June 2015*. Update: the RADF have selected the F-35 and 27 units are to be procured.

In 2003, 16 H-500 Cayuse and 13 Eurocopter AS550C2 Fennec from the Army Air Corps and eight Westland Lynx Mk. 90B from the Naval Air Squadron were supposed to be transferred to the air force. The 16 Cayuse and 13 Fennec helicopters were transferred to the newly re-formed Danish Squadron 724. The eight Lynx helicopters were supposed to enter another re-formed squadron, Squadron 728, but for political reasons those helicopters remained with the Navy. This change of "ownership" of the naval helicopters became effective on 1 January 2011 when the naval helicopters joined the newly formed Squadron 723.

In 2005, the 16 Cayuses were decommissioned, and also one of the Fennecs. The remaining 12 Fennecs took over many of the tasks from the Cayuses, including support-functions of the Danish police.

In 2006, the air force signed a letter of intent to purchase several of the Boeing Integrated Defense C-17 Globemaster III. That order needs to be confirmed, but it is to be made on the basis of the formation of a shared NATO C-17 air fleet to support international deployments. Denmark has later withdrawn from this arrangement but it is in existence today. See NATO Strategic Airlift Capability. The United States and the United Kingdom have already bought numerous C-17s, and several other NATO countries are considering doing so, too.
In June 2007, Denmark's six EH101 transport helicopters were transferred to the British Royal Air Force to meet an urgent British requirement for additional transport helicopters. In 2009 six replacement AW101 were delivered to the RDAF from AgustaWestland Yeowil and paid for by the UK.

2010s
In June 2010 the Sikorsky S-61 SAR helicopter was withdrawn.

The Danish Defence Acquisition and Logistics Organization (DALO), short listed five helicopters as potential replacements for the Lynx with around 12 new naval helicopters needed. The Sikorsky/Lockheed MH-60R, the NH90/NFH, H-92, AW159 and AW101 were on the short list and a Request For Proposal was issued on 30 September 2010. Ultimately the air force decided to buy nine Sikorsky SH-60 Seahawk helicopters.

In 2014, RDAF flew F-16 fighter jets in Greenland for the first time, testing the operational capabilities of maintaining sovereignty of the vast arctic airspace.

In 2005 the RDAF requested information about the possible procurement of a replacement for the F-16 fighter aircraft from the producers of the Gripen, Rafale, Eurofighter and Joint Strike Fighter, to which the RDAF has been a partner since 1997. Due to this fact Rafale-producer, Dassault Aviation, decided not to participate in the information round as they considered it to be biased towards the JSF option. This also led to the withdrawal of the Eurofighter in 2007, reentering in 2012. Meanwhile, the Boeing F-18 Super Hornet entered the competition in 2008. After several delays, a request for binding information was sent to the four candidates in April 2014 expecting a final decision in mid-2015. On 9 June 2016, the Danish Defence Committee agreed to purchase 27 F-35As to succeed the F-16. The price tag is US$3 billion.

In January 2020, Lockheed Martin announced that assembly had begun on L-001, the first of 27 F-35As destined for the Royal Danish Air Force.

Structure

Structure in the late 1980s 

The Royal Danish Air Force Command was headquartered at Karup Air Base and tasked to train, maintain and prepare the army for war. However operational control in peacetime rested with the Tactical Air Command. In wartime the air force's commander would have become the commander of Allied Air Forces Baltic Approaches (AIRBALTAP). AIRBALTAP commanded all flying units, flying reinforcements, all ground-based radar systems and stations, all air defence units and airfields in its sector. In war the entire Royal Danish Air Force would have come under AIRBALTAP.

In 1989 the Royal Danish Air Force consisted of the following units:

 Royal Danish Air Force, in Karup, commanded by a Danish lieutenant general
 Flyveskolen (Basic Flying School), Avnø Air Base, T-17 Supporter
 Air Force Materiel Command, Karup
 Air Force Depot Service
 Air Force Maintenance Service
 Air Force Ammunition Arsenal
 Tactical Air Command, Karup
 Aalborg Air Base
 Eskadrille 723, F-16A
 Eskadrille 726, F-16A
 Karup Air Base
 Eskadrille 725, F-35 Draken, TF-35 Draken
 Eskadrille 729, Reconnaissance, RF-35 Draken, TF-35 Draken
 Tirstrup Air Base
 Co-located Operating Base to be reinforced by U.S. Air Force / Royal Air Force squadrons 
 Vandel Air Base
 Co-located Operating Base to be reinforced by U.S. Air Force / Royal Air Force squadrons 
 Skrydstrup Air Base
 Eskadrille 727, F-16A
 Eskadrille 730, F-16A
 Værløse Air Base
 Eskadrille 721, Transport, C-130H Hercules, Gulfstream III
 Eskadrille 722, Search and rescue, S-61A helicopters
 Air Defence Command East, Skalstrup Air Station 
 Eskadrille 541, Stevns Fort, with 1x I-Hawk battery (6x launchers)
 Eskadrille 542, Kongelund Fort near Aflangshagen Air Station, with 1x I-Hawk battery (6x launchers)
 Eskadrille 543, Sigerslev Air Station, with 1x I-Hawk battery (6x launchers)
 Eskadrille 544, Tune near Skalstrup Air Station, with 1x I-Hawk battery (6x launchers)
 Air Defence Command West, Karup
 Eskadrille 531, Odense, with 1x I-Hawk battery (6x launchers)
 Eskadrille 532, Odense, with 1x I-Hawk battery (6x launchers) 
 Eskadrille 533, Skrydstrup Air Base, with 1x I-Hawk battery (6x launchers)
 Eskadrille 534, Karup Air Base, with 1x I-Hawk battery (6x launchers)
 Air Control Command, at Vedbæk Air Station
 Radar Station on Bornholm, with fixed S-723 radar
 Rader Station in Gripskov
 Radar Station at Skovhuse 
 Radar Station in Skagen, with fixed RAT-31DL radar
 Radar Station on Skrydstrup Air Base, with two mobile AN/TPS-77 radars
 Radar Station, at Sornfelli, Faroe Islands*

Structure in 2020 

 Air Command Denmark, at Karup Air Base
 National Air Operations Centre, at Karup Air Base
 Joint Movement and Transportation Organization (JMTO), at Karup Air Base
  Prince's Music Corps, originally from the army's Prince's Life Regiment
 Air Transport Wing, at Aalborg Air Base
 Eskadrille 721, with 4× C-130J-30 Super Hercules, 4× CL-604 (Airborne Surveillance)
 Operations Support Squadron
 Logistic Support Squadron
 Aircraft Maintenance Squadron
 Helicopter Wing, at Karup Air Base
 Eskadrille 722, with 14× AW101 Merlin (3× AW101 detached to Aalborg, Skrydstrup, and Roskilde Airport on 24/7 Search and Rescue duty)
 Eskadrille 723, with 9× MH-60R Seahawk
 Eskadrille 724, with 11× AS550 C2 Fennec
 Flyveskolen (Flying School), with 27× T-17 Supporter
 Operations Support Squadron
 Logistic Support Squadron
 Aircraft Maintenance Squadron
 Fighter Wing, at Skrydstrup Air Base
 Eskadrille 727, with 15× F-16AM/BM Falcon
 Eskadrille 730, with 15× F-16AM/BM Falcon
 Operations Support Squadron
 Logistic Support Squadron
 Aircraft Maintenance Squadron
 Air Control Wing, at Karup Air Base
 Control and Reporting Centre Karup (CRC Karup), reports to NATO's Integrated Air Defense System CAOC Uedem in Germany
 Mobile Air Control Centre
 Radar Station in Skagen, with fixed RAT-31DL radar
 Radar Station at Skrydstrup Air Base, with two mobile AN/TPS-77 radars
 Radar Station on Bornholm, with fixed S-723 radar
Radar Station, at Sornfelli, Faroe Islands*
 Operations Support Wing, at Karup Air Base
 Tactical Support Squadron
 Base Protection Squadron
 Mission Support Squadron
 Wing Reserve Squadron

Operations

From 1960 to 1964 RDAF S-55 helicopters flew missions for UNOC in the Congolese civil war.
In 1999, 9 F-16 fighters flew sorties over Serbia from Grazzanise AB, Italy as part of Operation Allied Force.
In 2002 and 2003, 6 F-16 fighter bombers flew 743 sorties against Taliban and al-Qaeda in Afghanistan from Ganci AB, Kyrgyzstan during Operation Enduring Freedom.
From July to October 2004, 4 F-16 fighters in Šiauliai, Lithuania, was Denmark's contribution to NATO's Operation Baltic Air Policing. The air policing mission was also undertaken by Danish F-16s in 2009, 2011 and 2013
 In 2005 three AS550C2 Fennec helicopters were deployed to Iraq for two months to assist the Danish ground forces during the first free elections in the country. In 2007 four Fennecs again deployed to Iraq, this time mainly to provide airborne reconnaissance for convoys on the ground around Basra. The helicopters completed 354 missions before returning home in December 2007.
4 AS550C2 Fennec helicopters belonging to the 724th Squadron of the Helicopter Wing were deployed to Afghanistan on 11 June 2008. These helicopters were based at Camp Bastion, northwest of Lashkar Gar, the capital of Helmand province, and were assigned to provide high altitude observation for Danish ground forces, as well as light transport.
 From 19 March 2011, 6 F-16 aircraft from Fighter Wing Skrydstrup were deployed to Naval Air Station Sigonella on Sicily to assist in maintaining the no-fly zone over Libya as part of the 2011 coalition intervention in Libya.
 From 11 July 2014, 3 EH-101 Merlin helicopters were deployed to Afghanistan. One suffered extensive damage when it rolled over during landing on 11 October 2014. No casualties.
 From 5 October 2014, seven F-16AM from Eskadrille 727 and 730 from Skrydstrup Airbase (Fighter Wing Skrydstrup) and 140 Danish personnel – ground crew and pilots – based at Ahmad al-Jaber Air Base in Kuwait to fight the Islamic State forces (ISIS / ISIL) as part of Operation Inherent Resolve.

Aircraft

Current inventory

Ranks

Commissioned officer ranks
The rank insignia of commissioned officers.

Other ranks
The rank insignia of non-commissioned officers and enlisted personnel.

See also

List of military aircraft of Denmark
Danish Defence
List of Lockheed F-104 Starfighter operators
Military of Greenland
NATO
Royal Danish Army
Royal Danish Navy
Scandinavian defence union

References

Bibliography

 Butler, Phil and Tony Buttler. Gloster Meteor: Britain's Celebrated First-Generation Jet. Hersham, Surrey, UK: Midland Publishing, 2006. .
 Crawford, Alex. Bristol Bulldog, Gloster Gauntlet. Redbourn, UK: Mushroom Model Publications, 2005. .
 De Jong, Peter. Le Fokker D.21 (Collection Profils Avions 9) (in French). Outreau, France: Éditions Lela Presse, 2005. . 
 Green, William and Gordon Swanborough. "Annals of the Gauntlet". Air Enthusiast Quarterly, No. 2, n.d., pp. 163–176.  
 Hall, Alan W. Hawker Hunter – Warpaint Series No 8. Bedfordshire, UK: Hall Park Books, 1997. ISSN 1363-0369.
 Hansen, O.S.:Danskernes Fly, 2003, Aschehoug,  
 Kofoed, Hans. Danske Militaerfly Gennem 50 Ar 1912–62. Copenhagen: Flyv's Forlag, 1962.

 Schrøder, Hans A. Det Danske Flyvevåben, Tøjhusmuseet, Denmark 1992. 
 Schrøder, Hans A. Historien om Flyvevåbnet, Komiteen til udgivelse af "Historien om Flyvevåbnet", 1990. .

External links
 Official website of the Danish Royal Air Force

 
Air forces by country
Military units and formations established in 1950
Military of Denmark
Military of Greenland
Military of the Faroe Islands
1950 establishments in Denmark